The Horse Creek Bridge was a covered bridge near the unincorporated community of McKenzie Bridge in Lane County in the U.S. state of Oregon. The creek is a tributary of the McKenzie River.

Bypassed by a concrete bridge in 1968, Horse Creek Bridge was not dismantled until 1987.
During the intervening years, it served as a pedestrian bridge. Its timbers were donated to the City of Cottage Grove, which used some of them to build a small covered bridge in a park. The remaining timbers were given to the City of Myrtle Creek in 1990 for a covered bridge over Myrtle Creek. The bridge connects a parking area to the city's Mill Site Park. The creek is a tributary of the South Umpqua River.

The 1930 bridge was added to the National Register of Historic Places in 1979 and removed after 1987. Features included Howe truss construction, ribbon openings at the eaves, rectangular arched portals, and an eye-level window on one side for spotting oncoming traffic.

See also
List of bridges documented by the Historic American Engineering Record in Oregon
List of bridges on the National Register of Historic Places in Oregon
List of Oregon covered bridges

References

External links
 (1930 bridge)

1930 establishments in Oregon
Covered bridges in Oregon
Former National Register of Historic Places in Oregon
Historic American Engineering Record in Oregon
Road bridges in Oregon
Covered bridges in Lane County, Oregon
Bridges in Douglas County, Oregon
Wooden bridges in Oregon
Tourist attractions in Douglas County, Oregon
Howe truss bridges in the United States